Andrew Edward Thomson MBE is a former international lawn and indoor bowler. Known as Andy Thomson he was born in Fife, Scotland, on 26 November 1955, and represented Scotland before deciding to represent England.

Bowls career
Thomson won the Buckhaven Club Championship at the age of 16 and one year later was the Fife under-30 champion. In 1978 he won the Scottish junior indoor title. After moving to Kent he claimed the 1981 EBA national singles.

He represented England in the singles, at the 1986 Commonwealth Games in Edinburgh, Scotland. Eight years later he partnered Gary Smith in the pairs and they won a bronze medal at the 1994 Commonwealth Games.

In 1993 he partnered Gary Smith as the pair won the World Indoor Bowls Championships Pairs title. Then in successive seasons he won the 1994 and 1995 World Indoor Bowls Championships men's singles title. 
In 1996 he was part of the men's fours who won the World Championships in Adelaide, Australia.
 
In 2008 & 2010 he won the pairs title with Ian Bond and also became World Matchplay champion in 2008.
At the WBT 2010 Awards Dinner he was awarded the 'Lifetime Achievement' Award as well as picking up his third World Indoor Pairs title.

In 2012 Andy Thomson won his third World Indoor Singles title, 17 years after his previous success. Three years later he reached the final once more, but was defeated by Alex Marshall.

Thomson spoke out against the new timing clock introduced for the 2013 World Indoor Championships.

He was appointed Member of the Order of the British Empire (MBE) in the 2013 New Year Honours for services to bowls.

In September 2018 Thomson retired from the England indoor team after reaching 114 caps. He later announced his full retirement following his wildcard participation in the 2021 World Indoor Bowls Championship.

Coaching
Thomson is a tactical coach for Bowls Australia and is part of the coaching team for the 2022 Commonwealth Games.

References

Scottish male bowls players
English male bowls players
Living people
Sportspeople from Fife
1955 births
Commonwealth Games medallists in lawn bowls
Commonwealth Games bronze medallists for England
Bowls World Champions
Indoor Bowls World Champions
Bowls players at the 1986 Commonwealth Games
Bowls players at the 1994 Commonwealth Games
Members of the Order of the British Empire
Medallists at the 1994 Commonwealth Games